USS Columbia was a steamer captured by the Union Navy during the American Civil War. She was used by the Union Navy to patrol navigable waterways of the Confederacy to prevent the South from trading with other countries.

Service history
Columbia, a screw steamer was captured on 3 August 1862 by  while running the blockade off the coast of Florida; purchased by the Navy from the Key West, Florida Prize Court on 4 November 1862; outfitted at New York Navy Yard; and commissioned sometime in December, Acting Volunteer Lieutenant Joseph Pitty Couthouy in command. While serving with the North Atlantic Blockading Squadron off Wilmington, North Carolina, Columbia ran aground and was wrecked off Masonboro Inlet on 14 January 1863. Forty men of her crew — including her commanding officer — were captured by the Confederates.

References

 

Ships of the Union Navy
Steamships of the United States Navy
Gunboats of the United States Navy
Shipwrecks of the American Civil War
Shipwrecks of the Carolina coast
Maritime incidents in January 1863